"When the Children Cry" is a power ballad  performed by Danish-American glam metal band White Lion. It is the third single and 10th and final track on their 1987 album, Pride. It peaked at number three on the US Billboard Hot 100, number two in Canada, and number 88 in the United Kingdom.

Background

The song was written immediately after Live Aid, and was partly influenced by singer Mike Tramp's childhood. He said, "“I was around five or six when my father left us. My mom was left with three boys. So without a doubt my own story is in that song."

He also said,

Versions
The song was re-recorded in 1999 on the album Remembering White Lion (also released as "Last Roar" in 2004) and a live version was released on the White Lion live album Rocking the USA. The re-recorded and live versions were both released as promo singles and later as iTunes singles. In 2004, an acoustic version of "When the Children Cry" was included on the VH1 Classic Metal Mania: Stripped compilation.

Track listing
7-inch single
 "When the Children Cry" – 4:04
 "Lady of the Valley" – 6:38

Personnel
 Mike Tramp – lead vocals
 Vito Bratta – lead guitar
 James LoMenzo – bass guitar
 Greg D'Angelo – drums

Charts

Weekly charts

Year-end charts

See also
 List of anti-war songs

References

1980s ballads
1987 songs
1988 singles
Anti-war songs
Atlantic Records singles
Glam metal ballads
Songs written by Mike Tramp
Songs written by Vito Bratta
White Lion songs